This is a list of notable events in country music that took place in 1968.

Events
 January 13 – Johnny Cash records his legendary concert at Folsom State Prison. The resulting album, At Folsom Prison, becomes a huge international success and a cornerstone of his music catalog; the lead single, "Folsom Prison Blues" (an update of his 1956 hit) becomes one of the most famous recordings of his career.
 February 1 – Elvis Presley's only child, Lisa Marie, is born in Memphis, Tennessee.
 March 1 – Johnny Cash and June Carter are married.
 November – The Country Music Association Awards are aired on television for the first time. Hosted by Roy Rogers and Dale Evans, the awards show is taped in October and aired on NBC a month later.
 December 3 – Elvis Presley's '68 Comeback Special airs on NBC. Although this special focuses more on the pop/rock side of his musical talents, the special will reinvigorate Presley's career in both the country and mainstream pop genres.

No dates
 The National Barn Dance – by now on WGN-AM – broadcasts its final show, after a run of 44 years.

Top hits of the year

Number one hits

United States
(as certified by Billboard)

Notes
1^ No. 1 song of the year, as determined by Billboard.
2^ Song dropped from No. 1 and later returned to top spot.
A^ First Billboard No. 1 hit for that artist.
B^ Last Billboard No. 1 hit for that artist.
C^ Only Billboard No. 1 hit for that artist to date.

Canada
(as certified by RPM)

Notes
2^ Song dropped from No. 1 and later returned to top spot.
A^ First RPM No. 1 hit for that artist.
C^ Only RPM No. 1 hit for that artist.

Other major hits

Singles released by American artists

Singles released by Canadian artists

Top new album releases

Births
 January 27 — Tracy Lawrence, singer with a string of hits in the 1990s and 2000s (decade) ("Sticks and Stones", "Alibis", "Find Out Who Your Friends Are", and others)
 March 26 — Kenny Chesney, became one of the genre's leading superstars in the late 1990s onward.
 June 3 — Jamie O'Neal, Australian-born female vocalist of the 2000s (decade).
 June 5 – Brett James, singer-songwriter.
 August 5 — Terri Clark, Canadian-born female vocalist since the mid-1990s.
 November 10 — Chris Cagle, contemporary-styled singer of the 2000s (decade)

 December 22 - Lori McKenna, singer/songwriter whose songs have impacted the lives of millions around the world. McKenna penned such hits as "Girl Crush" by Little Big Town and "Humble & Kind" by Tim McGraw. McKenna first gained fame in 2004, while in 2005 Faith Hill used 3 of McKenna’s songs on her Fireflies album. McKenna is currently one of the most in-demand artists on Music Row.

Deaths
 April 22 – Stephen H. Sholes, 57, music executive and record producer, most prominently with RCA Records (heart attack).
 May 8 – George D. Hay, 72, "The Solemn Old Judge", legendary announcer, first on WLS and later on WSM's Grand Ole Opry radio program.
 June 14 — Ernest "Pop" Stoneman, 75, country music pioneer and leader of the Stoneman Family.
 September 19 — Red Foley, 58, one of country music's top stars of the 1940s and 1950s (respiratory failure).

Country Music Hall of Fame Inductees
Bob Wills (1905–1975)

Major awards

Grammy Awards
Best Female Country Vocal Performance — "Harper Valley PTA", Jeannie C. Riley
Best Male Country Vocal Performance — "Folsom Prison Blues", Johnny Cash
Best Country Performance by a Duo or Group with Vocal — "Foggy Mountain Breakdown", Flatt & Scruggs
Best Country Song — "Little Green Apples", Bobby Russell (Performer: Roger Miller)

Academy of Country Music
Single of the Year — "Little Green Apples", Roger Miller
Album of the Year — Bobbie Gentry & Glen Campbell, Bobbie Gentry and Glen Campbell
Top Male Vocalist — Glen Campbell
Top Female Vocalist — Cathie Taylor
Top Vocal Duo — Johnny Mosby and Jonie Mosby
Top New Male Vocalist — Ray Sanders
Top New Female Vocalist — Cheryl Poole

Country Music Association
Founding President's Award (formerly Connie B. Gay Award) — Owen Bradley
Entertainer of the Year — Glen Campbell
Song of the Year — "Honey", Bobby Russell (Performer: Bobby Goldsboro)
Single of the Year — "Harper Valley PTA", Jeannie C. Riley
Album of the Year — At Folsom Prison, Johnny Cash
Male Vocalist of the Year — Glen Campbell
Female Vocalist of the Year — Tammy Wynette
Vocal Group of the Year — Porter Wagoner and Dolly Parton
Instrumentalist of the Year — Chet Atkins
Instrumental Group of the Year — The Buckaroos
Comedian of the Year — Ben Colder

Further reading
Kingsbury, Paul, "The Grand Ole Opry: History of Country Music. 70 Years of the Songs, the Stars and the Stories," Villard Books, Random House; Opryland USA, 1995
Kingsbury, Paul, "Vinyl Hayride: Country Music Album Covers 1947–1989," Country Music Foundation, 2003
Millard, Bob, "Country Music: 70 Years of America's Favorite Music," HarperCollins, New York, 1993
Whitburn, Joel, "Top Country Songs 1944–2005 – 6th Edition." 2005.

Other links
Country Music Association
Inductees of the Country Music Hall of Fame

External links
Country Music Hall of Fame

Country
Country music by year